Martin Grove could mean any of the following:

 Martin Grove Road, a secondary north–south thoroughfare in Etobicoke  and Vaughan,  in the province of Ontario, Canada
 Martin Grove, a Vivastation of the Viva Orange rapid transit line in Toronto, Canada
 Martingrove Collegiate Institute, a secondary school in Etobicoke, Toronto, Ontario, Canada
 Martin Grove Brumbaugh (1862–1930), an American politician
 Martin Groves, a British hillclimb driver